Leach-Biltwell Motor Company manufactured and distributed the Leach luxury automobile from 1919 to 1924 in Los Angeles, California.

History 
Leach-Biltwell Motor Company was a west-coast automobile manufacturer. Martin Andrew Leach of the Leach Motor Car Company formed Leach-Biltwell for automobile coachbuilding and customization.  In 1919 the company was re-capitalized and began producing complete automobiles. Leach purchased the Republic Truck Company factory and began production of the Leach Power-Plus Six motorcar.

In 1922 the company again re-capitalized and expanded by purchasing the Miller Engine and Foundry works. Harry A. Miller became a vice-president of Leach-Biltwell and developed a new engine for the company. In 1923 the company was in financial trouble and introduced a smaller automobile called the California. In 1924, the company moved to a smaller factory and discontinued the Leach Power-Plus Six.

Models 
The Leach Power-Plus Six used a model 9N Red Seal Continental 303.1 cubic inch 60 hp inline six-cylinder engine.   Touring coachwork on a 128-inch wheelbase featured two or four door body styles. Leach popularized the distinctive "California top" that was a precursor of the "hardtop" body style thirty years later.  In 1922 the engine was changed to a Miller model 999 100 hp Ohc six-cylinder engine, on a 134-inch wheelbase. This technically advanced engine had teething troubles and many were replaced with Continentals.

For luxury customization, the Leach included a tilt and telescoping steering column, removable steering wheel (to be used as an anti-theft feature), a directional signal/stop light box with a dashboard switch, lighted aluminum steps instead of running boards, a one piece windshield and disc wheels with chromium rims.

The Leach was priced in 1920 from $5,200 to a high in 1922 of $6,500.  From 218 to 264 cars (chassis with and without factory bodies) were produced.

Advertising 
Leach-Biltwell displayed a Leach at the 1920 Chicago Auto Show.  Although primarily sold in California, with the slogan "The Aristocrat of Motordom",  Leach advertised in major magazines to attract national attention.

References

External links
Hollywood Glamour: Meet The Only Surviving 1922 Leach Model 22A

Defunct motor vehicle manufacturers of the United States
Luxury motor vehicle manufacturers
Luxury vehicles
1920s cars
Vintage vehicles
Cars introduced in 1919
Vehicle manufacturing companies established in 1919
Vehicle manufacturing companies disestablished in 1924
Coachbuilders of the United States
Motor vehicle manufacturers based in California